Viktors Pūpols  (born July 31, 1934) is an American chess master. Known by many local players as "Uncle Vik," he frequently plays at the Tacoma Chess Club. He was the Club Champion in 1955, and some of his games can be viewed online at the club's website. Pupols is currently married to Deborah Petzal-Pupols.

Notable games

In 1955, Pupols played in the U.S. Junior Championship Open in Lincoln, Nebraska, won by Charles Kalme. Pupols beat young Bobby Fischer with a Latvian Gambit. This is one of only two games that Fischer ever lost on time (see time control). Fischer became the world's youngest grandmaster three years later.

He first played in the Washington State Championship tournament in 1954. He has played in most of the tournaments since, winning outright in 1961, 1974, and 1989, and tying for first in 1978. He won the tournament in 1964, but Gerald Ronning took the title in a match.

In 1975, he tied for 6th-11th in Vancouver (Paul Keres won, shortly before his death). In 1980, he won the Keres Memorial in Vancouver. He thrice won the Idaho Open (1984, 1985, and 1986). Just as he first did in 1956 as a teenage wunderkind, Pupols again won the Eastern Washington Open in 2005 after a final round draw with three time Spokane Chess Champion Curt Collyer.

Fischer versus Pupols, U.S. Junior Championship 1955 
1.e4 e5 2.Nf3 f5 3.Nxe5 Qf6 4.d4 d6 5.Nc4 fxe4 6.Nc3 Qg6 7.Ne3 Nf6 8.Bc4 c6 9.d5 Be7 10.a4 Nbd7 11.a5 Ne5 12.Be2 0-0 13.0-0 Bd7 14.Kh1 Kh8 15.Nc4 Nfg4 16.Qe1 Rf7 17.h3 Nf6 18.Nxe5 dxe5 19.Bc4 Rff8 20.Be3 Nh5 21.Kh2 Bd6 22.Bb3 Nf4 23.Bxf4 exf4 24.Qxe4 f3+ 25.g3 Bf5 26.Qh4 Rae8 27.Rae1 Be5 28.Qb4 Qh6 29.h4 g5 30.Rh1 gxh4 31.Kg1 h3 32.dxc6 bxc6 33.Qc5 Qg7 34.Kh2 Qf6 35.Qxa7 Bd4 36.Qc7 Bxf2 37.Rxe8 Rxe8 38.Rf1 Bd4 39.Rxf3 Bxc3 40.bxc3 Re2+ 41.Kh1 Be4 42.Qc8+ Kg7 43.Qg4+ Qg6 44.Qd7+ Kh6 0–1

Biography by Larry Parr
A biography of Pupols, Viktors Pupols, American Master, was written by Larry Parr and published by Thinkers' Press in 1983. Viktors describes his encounters with young Grandmaster-to-be Yasser Seirawan: "I could not even see my opponent. All I could hear was a voice calling out from under the table - Check!!".

See also
Last Exit on Brooklyn

References

External links
 Photo of Pupols used on the cover of NW Chess, Chess Journalists of America winning chess photo, 2009.

Latvian chess players
American chess players
1935 births
Living people